In enzymology, a GDP-L-fucose synthase is an enzyme that catalyzes the chemical reaction

GDP-4-dehydro-6-deoxy-D-mannose + NADPH + H+  GDP-L-fucose + NADP+

Thus, the three substrates of this enzyme are GDP-4-dehydro-6-deoxy-D-mannose, NADPH, and H+, whereas its two products are GDP-L-fucose and NADP+.

This enzyme belongs to the family of oxidoreductases, specifically those acting on the CH-OH group of donor with NAD+ or NADP+ as acceptor. The systematic name of this enzyme class is GDP-L-fucose:NADP+ 4-oxidoreductase (3,5-epimerizing). This enzyme is also called GDP-4-keto-6-deoxy-D-mannose-3,5-epimerase-4-reductase. This enzyme participates in fructose and mannose metabolism.

Relevance in diseases

It has been reported that some cases of multiple sclerosis that present the HLA variant DRB3, present also autoimmunity against GDP-L-fucose synthase. The same report points out that the autoimmune problem could derive from the gut microbiota.

See also

Guanosine diphosphate
Guanosine diphosphate mannose

References

 
 
 
 

EC 1.1.1
NADPH-dependent enzymes
Enzymes of unknown structure